Tephrite is an igneous, volcanic (extrusive) rock,  with aphanitic to porphyritic texture. Mineral content is usually abundant feldspathoids (leucite or nepheline), plagioclase, and lesser alkali feldspar. Pyroxenes (clinopyroxenes) are common accessory minerals. Quartz and olivine are absent. Occurrences include leucite nepheline tephrite from Hamberg bei Neckarelz near Heidelberg, Germany, phonolite-tephrite at Monte Vulture, Basilicata, Italy and basanite–tephrite intrusions in Namibia.

References

Volcanic rocks